This is a list of places and properties listed on the National Register of Historic Places in Medford, Massachusetts.



Current listings

|}

References

Buildings and structures in Medford, Massachusetts
Medford
Medford, Massachusetts